The 2015 Tour de Pologne was the 72nd edition of the Tour de Pologne stage race. It took place from 2 to 8 August and was the twentieth race of the 2015 UCI World Tour. It was won by the Spanish cyclist Jon Izagirre.

Schedule

Participating teams
As the Tour de Pologne is a UCI World Tour event, all seventeen UCI Pro Teams were invited automatically and obliged to enter a team into the race. Two wildcard teams were also given places:  and a Polish national team.

Stages

Stage 1

2 August 2015 — Warsaw to Warsaw, 
The 2015 Tour de Pologne begins in Warsaw, with the shortest road stage of the entire race. On the ninth lap, there will be an intermediate sprint at the Krasiński Square, whilst the sole categorised climb will be a third category ascent on the seventh lap, on the Karowa Street. Then, a sprint finish is expected, largely due to the very flat profile of the stage.

Stage 2

3 August 2015 — Częstochowa to Dąbrowa Górnicza, 
The second stage will take the riders into Silesia. After the start in Częstochowa, the peloton will head southwards towards the Silesian Metropolis. The intermediate sprints of the day will be in Siewierz and Będzin. There will also be two categorised climbs, again in Będzin but also in Dąbrowa Górnicza, where five laps of a  circuit will be held. Again, it is predicted that the sprinters will dominate.

Stage 3

4 August 2015 — Zawiercie to Katowice, 
The last stage designed for the sprinters is held within the Silesian Metropolis. After the start in Zawiercie, the peloton will head east towards Tarnowskie Góry, where a special sprint will take place. Then, the riders will turn south-east and pass through Piekary Śląskie, Chorzów and Siemanowice Śląskie, each of which will host an intermediate sprint, before entering a finishing circuit  in length, to be completed four times. On the second lap, there will be a third-category mountains sprint at the Korfantego street, and then on the fourth lap there will be a third-category mountains sprint at the Góreckiego street. The final  is downhill, and speeds there reach . The road is being used continuously since 2010 and saw victories for Yauheni Hutarovich, Marcel Kittel in 2011, Aidis Kruopis in 2012, Taylor Phinney in  2013 and Jonas Vangenechten the year before.

Stage 4

5 August 2015 — Jaworzno to Nowy Sącz, 
The first stage which is not due to finish in a sprint. The maximum gradient there is 18%. The sole intermediate sprint is located in Wadowice, prior to the climbing. After the descent from Trzetrzewina, the peloton will complete three loops of a  circuit in Nowy Sącz, to conclude the day's running.

Stage 5

6 August 2015 — Nowy Sącz to Zakopane, 
The longest stage of the race is also the first mountainous stage, featuring eight categorised climbs. After starting from the previous day's finish site, Nowy Sącz, the peloton will firstly head south to get to Zakopane and will enter the finishing circuit half-way through it. They will pass through the first-category ascents of Ząb and Gubałówka (used for the first time) before passing through the finish line for the first time. From then, the riders will complete two laps of a circuit  in length. This includes the first-category Głodówka and the previously mentioned Ząb and Gubałówka ascents. On the last lap, there are two intermediate sprints, held in Poronin and Koscielisko.

Stage 6

7 August 2015 — Terma Bukowina Tatrzańska to Bukowina Tatrzańska, 
The queen stage of the 2014 Tour de Pologne is, since 2011, a circuit race around Bukowina Tatrzańska (although the village was visited in 2010). To make up the parcours of 174 km, the peloton will firstly completed a 5 km ride to Zakopane, three 5.3 km loops around Zakopane on which were two special sprints, a return 5 km ride before entering a 38.4 km loop to be completed four times. Each loop featured three climbs – a first category ascent to Ząb, with gradients reaching 11.5%, a first category ascent to Gliczarów Górny, with gradients reaching a huge 21.5% and the final, uncategorised ascent to Bukowina Tatrzańska. In total, the riders completed nearly 4000m of climbing during the stage. This stage should be the most decisive in the general classification.

Stage 7

8 August 2015 — Kraków to Kraków, individual time trial (ITT)
The last stage will be a time trial starting and finishing at the Main Square in Kraków. The route was identical to that of last year, and had the riders head south-east towards Wieliczka, before completing a U-turn in Wieliczka and heading north-west back to Kraków. Despite being virtually pan-flat, this stage is also scheduled to have a large impact on the general classification.  As is customary of time trial stages, cyclists will set off in reverse order from where they were ranked in the general classification at the end of the previous stage.

Category leadership table

Notes
 In stage two, Caleb Ewan, who was second in the points classification, wore the white jersey, because first placed Marcel Kittel wore the yellow jersey as leader of the general classification. Also, in stages three and four, Niccolò Bonifazio wore the white jersey for the same reason.
 In stage five, Gatis Smukulis, who was second in the mountains classification, wore the fuchsia jersey, because first placed Kamil Zieliński wore the yellow jersey as leader of the general classification.

References

External links 

 

Tour de Pologne
Tour de Pologne
Tour de Pologne
August 2015 sports events in Europe